Pablo Hernández Domínguez (born 11 April 1985) is a Spanish professional footballer who plays as an attacking midfielder but also as a winger for Castellón, where he is also a part-owner.

In a spell which also included two loans, he played the early part of his career with Valencia, appearing in 158 official matches and scoring 25 goals. He also competed in Wales for two years with Swansea City, and several seasons in England with Leeds United. 

Hernández represented Spain at the 2009 Confederations Cup.

Club career

Valencia
Born in Castellón de la Plana, Province of Castellón, Valencian Community, Hernández was a product of Valencia's youth system (operating as striker in the B team). He made his debut with the main squad on the last matchday of 2005–06, playing 20 minutes in a 1–2 away loss against Osasuna. Midway through the following season, he was loaned to Segunda División side Cádiz.

In July 2007, Valencia included Hernández in the transfer that brought Alexis from Getafe to the Mestalla Stadium, but would re-buy him for €1 million in July 2008. The player was subsequently signed to a six-year contract.

Hernández scored his first goal for Valencia on 27 November 2008, in a 4–0 win over Rosenborg in the group stage of the UEFA Cup, after an individual effort. After having subbed in for Rubén Baraja in the second half of a home fixture with Recreativo, he netted his second and first in the league, in a 1–1 draw in March 2009. The following month, also as a replacement but now for Joaquín, he added his third, in a 3–1 home defeat of Sevilla – deep into injury time, against ten men.

On 25 April 2009, this time as a starter, Hernández fired the hosts into the 2–1 lead against Barcelona, following a run between four players and a one-two with Juan Mata; the match ended 2–2. He scored the second goal in 2009–10's opener, against Sevilla in a 2–0 home victory. Fully established in the starting XI now over Joaquín, he continued to produce fine displays during the campaign, including a 40-meter lob to help defeat Almería 3–0 away.

Hernández scored twice against Club Brugge in extra time of the UEFA Europa League round-of-32 second leg game played at the Mestalla on 25 February 2010, for a 3–0 win (3–1 on aggregate). In 2010–11, he continued battling with Joaquín for first-choice status. On 7 December 2010, he netted at Manchester United in the UEFA Champions League, putting the Che 1–0 up at half-time in a 1–1 group stage draw.

Swansea City
On 31 August 2012, Hernández moved to Premier League side Swansea City for three years and a club-record fee of £5.55 million. He scored his first official goal on 20 October, helping to a 2–1 home victory over Wigan Athletic.

Hernández scored his second goal for the Swans on 3 November 2012, a late equaliser in a 1–1 draw against Chelsea at the Liberty Stadium. He was named to the team of the week published on 3 September by Sky Sports, and started in the final of the Football League Cup on 24 February 2013, helping to a 5–0 rout of Bradford City.

Al-Arabi
On 15 July 2014, Hernández joined Al-Arabi on a three-year deal, having started talks with the Qatari club the previous week. The fee was unknown, but it was speculated that the fee would be lower than the amount paid by Swansea to Valencia for his services two years before.

Hernández returned to Spain and its top tier on 31 August 2015 after a loan spell at Al-Nasr Dubai, agreeing to a one-year loan deal with Rayo Vallecano. He started regularly for the team from the Madrid outskirts, who ended the campaign with relegation.

Leeds United
On 2 August 2016, Hernández signed with Championship club Leeds United on a six-month loan deal, with the option of a permanent move in January 2017, linking up with former Swansea manager Garry Monk and being given the number 19 shirt. After the former failed to receive his paperwork in time from the Qatar Football Association for the opening fixture against Queens Park Rangers (which ended in a 3–0 defeat), he made his debut on 10 August in a 3–2 win at Fleetwood Town in the EFL Cup.

Hernández's league debut for Leeds came in a 1–2 home loss to Birmingham City, on 13 August 2016. On 17 September he scored his first goal, with a curling effort in a 2–0 victory over Cardiff City. On 5 November, he picked up a hamstring injury late on in a 3–2 win against Norwich City at Carrow Road, returning to action after almost two months; he celebrated his return on 26 December with a goal after replacing Hadi Sacko, helping defeat hosts Preston North End 4–1.

Hernández signed a permanent six-month contract on 9 January 2017, with the option to extend the link by 12 months at the end of the season. He appeared in his first match after the new agreement four days later, helping his team climb to third in the table after beating Derby County 1–0 at home and being named Player of the match in the process.

On 17 May 2017, the 32-year-old Hernández agreed to a new one-year deal. On 16 April 2018, he was nominated as one of four players for the Leeds Player of The Year award. Ten days later, he ended speculation about his future (with his contract close to expiry) by signing a new two-year extension until June 2020, and on 5 May, he won both its Player of the Year and Players Player Of The Year awards at the annual ceremony.

On 25 August 2018, after Hernández had scored his third goal in five league games, manager Marcelo Bielsa hailed him as "a complete player from every point of view", adding that he had only rarely in his career seen a wide player exert such influence over the whole pitch. On 5 September, he won the Professional Footballers' Association Championship Player Of The Month award for August.

After helping Leeds to a third-place finish in the 2018–19 campaign, Hernández was voted into the PFA Team of the Year on 24 April. Four days later, he again won his team's Player of the Year and Players Player Of The Year awards.

On 19 November 2019, Hernández put pen to paper to an extension until 2022. His two crucial match-winning goals at home in early 2020 against Millwall and Reading were key to maintaining sustained pressure on West Bromwich Albion at the top of the table. He finished with nine for the eventual champions by the end of the season, in a return to the Premier League after 16 years.

Castellón
Hernández returned to Spain after five years on 20 July 2021, joining Castellón who had been recently relegated to the newly created Primera División RFEF; a three-year contract was signed.

International career
After close observation by Spain national team manager Luis Aragonés during his time at Getafe, Hernández was picked for the 32-man provisional squad for UEFA Euro 2008, but did not make the final cut. On 5 June 2009, he was called to represent the country at the 2009 FIFA Confederations Cup in South Africa as a replacement for injured Andrés Iniesta, by new boss Vicente del Bosque. He earned his first cap on the 20th, coming on as a substitute for club teammate David Villa in the 60th minute of the last group stage match, a 2–0 defeat of the hosts. 

Hernández scored his first international goal on 18 November 2009, playing the entire second half of the 5–1 friendly win in Austria and closing the scoresheet.

Playing style
In 2016, the Yorkshire Evening Post described Hernández as the "most creative player in the Championship," due largely to his runs behind the defence, skill at picking out dangerous passes in open play and aptitude at taking corners and other free kicks.

Club ownership
In June 2017, Hernández became co-owner of Spanish club Castellón (alongside former Valencia teammate Ángel Dealbert and others), where he had started playing 20 years ago. Under his first season of ownership, it won promotion from Tercera División; they both left due to disagreements regarding the team in April 2019, but kept their position as shareholders.

Personal life
Hernández' wife, Mar García, is the sister of professional golfer Sergio García, who competes on both the PGA Tour and the PGA European Tour.

He has two sons, Eric and Luca. He is often seen kissing his arms after scoring a goal, where he has tattoos of The Virgin Mary and his sons’ names.

Career statistics

Club

International

Scores and results list Spain's goal tally first.

Honours
Getafe
Copa del Rey runner-up: 2007–08

Swansea City
Football League Cup: 2012–13

Leeds United 
EFL Championship: 2019–20

Al-Nasr
UAE President's Cup: 2014–15
UAE League Cup: 2014–15

Spain
FIFA Confederations Cup third place: 2009

Individual
Leeds United Player of the Year/Players Player of the Year: 2017–18, 2018–19, 2019–20
Professional Footballers' Association Championship Player Of The Month: August 2018
PFA Team of the Year: 2018–19 Championship

References

External links

CiberChe biography and stats 
Stats and bio at Cadistas1910 

1985 births
Living people
Sportspeople from Castellón de la Plana
Spanish footballers
Footballers from the Valencian Community
Association football midfielders
Association football wingers
La Liga players
Segunda División players
Segunda División B players
Primera Federación players
Tercera División players
Valencia CF Mestalla footballers
Valencia CF players
Cádiz CF players
Getafe CF footballers
Rayo Vallecano players
CD Castellón footballers
Premier League players
English Football League players
Swansea City A.F.C. players
Leeds United F.C. players
Qatar Stars League players
Al-Arabi SC (Qatar) players
UAE Pro League players
Al-Nasr SC (Dubai) players
Spain international footballers
2009 FIFA Confederations Cup players
Spanish expatriate footballers
Expatriate footballers in Wales
Expatriate footballers in Qatar
Expatriate footballers in the United Arab Emirates
Expatriate footballers in England
Spanish expatriate sportspeople in Wales
Spanish expatriate sportspeople in Qatar
Spanish expatriate sportspeople in the United Arab Emirates
Spanish expatriate sportspeople in England